Sam Kristen Hughes (born June 28, 1992) is an American mixed martial artist who is currently competing in the Strawweight division of the Ultimate Fighting Championship (UFC).

Background
Hughes grew up with three older brothers in South Carolina, where she also ran track in high school. At Wofford College for her undergraduate studies in accounting and finance, she ran track and field and cross country at NCAA Division I level. She continued competing in track when she made the move to the University of South Carolina to pursue her masters in Sports Management. But after graduation, Hughes took a job in the finance world, which took her to Seattle. A friend invited her to Catalyst Fight House, in Everett, Washington and Hughes embarked on her amateur career in 2016 after a few months training at Catalyst. Hughes turned pro in 2019, due to her last amateur opponent, Melanie McIntyre, who after losing to Hughes, wanted a rematch as a pro. However, McIntyre pulled out of the fight and Hughes wound up making her debut a month later.

Mixed martial arts career

Early career
Making her MMA debut at COGA 62 Supreme Showdown 4, she defeated Kayla Frajman via rear-naked choke in the first round. Hughes would collect two more stoppage victories, one by second round TKO and the other by first round armbar submission.

In her debut fight for Legacy Fighting Alliance at LFA 81, she took on Lisa Mauldin and defeated her via unanimous decision.

Hughes faced Vanessa Demopoulos for the inaugural LFA Women's Strawweight Championship on July 17, 2020 at LFA 85. She lost the bout after being choked unconscious in the 4th round via inverted triangle choke.

Hughes faced Danielle Hindley on October 16, 202 at LFA 93. She won the bout, chocking Hindley unconscious via guillotine choke at the end of the first round.

Ultimate Fighting Championship
Replacing Angela Hill who tested positive for COVID-19, Hughes signed with the UFC and faced Tecia Torres. She lost the fight via doctor stoppage between round one and two after saying she couldn't see out of one of her eyes.

Hughes, as a replacement for Hannah Cifers, was expected to face Emily Whitmire on February 27, 2021 at UFC Fight Night: Rozenstruik vs. Gane. Whitmire was removed from the bout on February 14 due to undisclosed reasons, and the bout was cancelled.

Hughes faced Loma Lookboonmee on May 1, 2021 at UFC on ESPN: Reyes vs. Procházka. She lost the bout via unanimous decision.

Hughes was scheduled to face Lupita Godinez on October 9, 2021 at UFC Fight Night: Dern vs. Rodriguez. However, Hughes was pulled from the bout for testing positive of Covid-19 and she was replaced by newcomer Silvana Gomez Juarez.

Hughes, as a replacement for Jessica Penne, faced Luana Pinheiro on November 20, 2021 at UFC Fight Night: Vieira vs. Tate. She lost the bout via unanimous decision.

Hughes faced Istela Nunes at UFC on ESPN 34 on April 16, 2022. She won the fight via majority decision. The bout marked the last of her prevailing contract.

Hughes faced Elise Reed at UFC Fight Night 206 on May 21, 2022. She won the fight via technical knockout in round three.

Hughes faced Piera Rodríguez on October 15, 2022 at  UFC Fight Night 212. She lost the bout via unanimous decision.

Hughes is scheduled to face Jacqueline Amorim on April 8, 2023, at UFC 287.

Mixed martial arts record

|-
|Loss
|align=center|7–5
|Piera Rodríguez
|Decision (unanimous)
|UFC Fight Night: Grasso vs. Araújo
|
|align=center|3
|align=center|5:00
|Las Vegas, Nevada, United States
|
|-
|Win
|align=center|7–4
|Elise Reed
|TKO (elbow and punches)
|UFC Fight Night: Holm vs. Vieira
|
|align=center|3
|align=center|3:52
|Las Vegas, Nevada, United States
|
|-
|Win
|align=center|6–4
|Istela Nunes
|Decision (majority)
|UFC on ESPN: Luque vs. Muhammad 2
|
|align=center|3
|align=center|5:00
|Las Vegas, Nevada, United States
|
|-
|Loss
|align=center|5–4
|Luana Pinheiro
|Decision (unanimous)
|UFC Fight Night: Vieira vs. Tate
|
|align=center|3
|align=center|5:00
|Las Vegas, Nevada, United States
| 
|-
| Loss
| align=center|5–3
| Loma Lookboonmee
|Decision (unanimous)
|UFC on ESPN: Reyes vs. Procházka 
|
|align=center|3
|align=center|5:00
|Las Vegas, Nevada, United States
| 
|-
| Loss
| align=center|5–2
| Tecia Torres
|TKO (doctor stoppage)
|UFC 256 
|
|align=center|1
|align=center|5:00
|Las Vegas, Nevada, United States
|
|-
| Win
| align=center| 5–1
|Danielle Hindley
|Technical Submission (guillotine choke)
|LFA 93
|
|align=center|1
|align=center|5:00
|Park City, Kansas, United States
|
|-
| Loss
| align=center|4–1
|Vanessa Demopoulos
| Technical Submission (inverted triangle choke)
| LFA 85
| 
| align=center| 4
| align=center| 2:21
| Sioux Falls, South Dakota, United States
| 
|-
| Win
| align=center| 4–0
| Lisa Mauldin
|Decision (unanimous)
|LFA 81
|
| align=center| 3
| align=center| 5:00
|Costa Mesa, California, United States
|
|-
| Win
| align=center|3–0
| Bethany Christensen
|Submission (armbar)
|Battle at the Bay 15
|
| align=center|1
| align=center|0:52
|Anacortes, Washington, United States
|
|-
| Win
| align=center| 2–0
| Loren Benjar
| TKO (knee to the body and punches)
|XKO 46: Summer Bash
|
| align=center|2
| align=center|1:30
|Dallas, Texas, United States
|
|-
| Win
| align=center|1–0
| Kyla Frajman
| Submission (rear-naked choke)
|Combat Games 62
|
|align=center|1
|align=center|1:35
|Tulalip, Washington, United States
|

See also 
 List of current UFC fighters
 List of female mixed martial artists

References

External links 
  
 

1992 births
Living people
American female mixed martial artists
Strawweight mixed martial artists
Mixed martial artists utilizing Brazilian jiu-jitsu
Ultimate Fighting Championship female fighters
American practitioners of Brazilian jiu-jitsu
Female Brazilian jiu-jitsu practitioners